Mervyn Hutton (24 August 1911 – 28 September 1988) was an Australian cricketer. He played in one first-class match for South Australia in 1930/31.

References

External links
 

1911 births
1988 deaths
Australian cricketers
South Australia cricketers
People from Port Augusta